Tongtianguanfu is a form of court attire in hanfu which was worn by the Emperor during the Song dynasty on very important occasions, such as grand court sessions and during major title-granting ceremonies.It was also worn in the Jin dynasty Emperors when the apparel system of the Song dynasty was imitated and formed their own carriages and apparel system, and in the Ming dynasty. The tongtianguanfu was composed of a red outer robe, a white inner robe, a bixi, and a guan called tongtianguan, and a neck accessory called fangxin quling.

Terminology 
The term tongtian means "direct links with heaven".

Composition and construction 
The tongtianguanfu is composed of:

The gauze outer robe (paofu), called jiangshapao. It was crimson in colour with patterns of clouds and dragons embroidery which was gold and red in colours. There were black borders stitched to the collar, sleeves, lapels and hems of the crimson outer robe. 

The crimson outer robe was worn with a red gauze skirt and a crimson bixi (knee cover) was fastened around the waist of its wearer. The inner garment was a white robe.

The high crown was called tongtianguan, which was also known as chengtianguan. The tongtianguan was exclusively worn by the Emperor during some grand ceremonies. The tongtianguan of the Emperor had 24 beams. 

A pendant-like ornament called fangxin quling was hung around the neck. The fangxin quling was a notable feature in the ceremonial court attire of the Song and Ming dynasties. It was made out of silk and was cut into a circle (which hung around the neck and shoulder areas) and a square (either solid or open square) which would fall over the cross-collared lapels of the paofu. The shape of the circle and square symbolized the Heaven and earth respectively.

A belt with ribbons was also tied to the waist. 

As footwear, the Emperor would have worn white stockings and black shoes.

See also 

 Hanfu
 List of Hanfu

References 

Chinese traditional clothing